Un povero ricco, also known as Rich and Poor, is a 1983 Italian comedy film directed by Pasquale Festa Campanile.

Plot 
The engineer Eugenio Ronconi lives in Milan a comfortable life, but he is increasingly obsessed of losing all his wealth and become poor. On the advice of his psychologist, therefore he decides to "become" poor for about a month.

Cast 

Renato Pozzetto:  Eugenio Ronconi / Eugenio Ragona
Ornella Muti: Marta
Piero Mazzarella: Stanislao aka Fosforo
Patrizia Fontana: Romina 
Nanni Svampa: butler
Corrado Olmi: Neroni  
Ugo Gregoretti: psychologist

See also    
 List of Italian films of 1983

References

External links

1983 films
Italian comedy films
1983 comedy films
Films directed by Pasquale Festa Campanile
Films set in Milan
Films shot in Milan
Films shot in Rome
Films scored by Stelvio Cipriani
1980s Italian-language films
1980s Italian films